Our Children  (Unzere kinder) is a 1946 semi-documentary Yiddish-language film  created in Polish People's Republic. Its frame story is the interaction  of Jewish orphans who survived the Holocaust  with popular Polish comic duo Dzigan and Shumacher After the premiere the film was banned in Poland. In 1951 an English-language dubbing was released under the title It Will Never Happen Again,

Film history
It was one of the first films about the Holocaust and probably the first one to deal with the issue of "correct" representation of the post-Holocaust trauma. Marc Caplan of Johns Hopkins University describes the film genre as "mixing satire, idyl, Holocaust testimony, and expressions of defiant hope". Described as "semi-documentary", much of the film is fictional, including children's Holocaust reminiscences.

One of the child survivors starring in the film is Shimon Redlich.

In 1979 the original nitrate print was discovered and the film was restored by 1991, with English captions added.

Plot summary
A group of Jewish orphans who survived the Holocaust, on a trip from their orphanage attend a show of Dzigan and Shumacher who staged a comic skit named "Singers of the  Ghetto", as two beggars singing and dancing for food. Disagreeing with the portrayal of ghetto life, they heckle the show. Later they invite the comics to their orphanage so that they can tell then the true story. The comics accept the invitation and present there their best shows. At night they overhear children telling each other stories of their life. Next day they suggest children to present their own plays...

References

Further reading
J. Hoberman, Bridge of Light: Yiddish Film Between Two Worlds, pp.330,331

1948 films
Polish documentary films
Polish drama films
Yiddish-language films
Films about the aftermath of the Holocaust
Child refugees

External links
Formats and editions of the film, WorldCat
From the film: Dzigan and Schumacher presenting a skit from Sholem Aleichem's Kasrilevke brent (Kasrilevke is Burning) at the orphanage